Muammar Muhammad Abu Minyar al-Gaddafi (20 October 2011), also known as Colonel Gaddafi, was a Libyan politician, revolutionary, and political theorist. He was the de facto leader of Libya from 1969 to 2011, first as Revolutionary Chairman of the Libyan Arab Republic from 1969 to 1977 and then as the Brotherly Leader of the Great Socialist People's Libyan Arab Jamahiriya from 1977 to 2011. Initially ideologically committed to Arab nationalism and Arab socialism, he later ruled according to his own Third International Theory.

Born near Sirte, Italian Libya, to a poor Bedouin Arab family, Gaddafi became an Arab nationalist while at school in Sabha, later enrolling in the Royal Military Academy, Benghazi. Within the military, he founded a revolutionary group which deposed the Western-backed Senussi monarchy of Idris in a 1969 coup. Having taken power, Gaddafi converted Libya into a republic governed by his Revolutionary Command Council. Ruling by decree, he deported Libya's Italian population and ejected its Western military bases. Strengthening ties to Arab nationalist governments—particularly Gamal Abdel Nasser's Egypt—he unsuccessfully advocated pan-Arab political union. An Islamic modernist, he introduced sharia as the basis for the legal system and promoted "Islamic socialism". He nationalized the oil industry and used the increasing state revenues to bolster the military, fund foreign revolutionaries, and implement social programs emphasizing house-building, healthcare and education projects. In 1973, he initiated a "Popular Revolution" with the formation of Basic People's Congresses, presented as a system of direct democracy, but retained personal control over major decisions. He outlined his Third International Theory that year in The Green Book.

Gaddafi transformed Libya into a new socialist state called a Jamahiriya ("state of the masses") in 1977. He officially adopted a symbolic role in governance but remained head of both the military and the Revolutionary Committees responsible for policing and suppressing dissent. During the 1970s and 1980s, Libya's unsuccessful border conflicts with Egypt and Chad, support for foreign militants, and alleged responsibility for bombings of Pan Am Flight 103 and UTA Flight 772 left it increasingly isolated on the world stage. A particularly hostile relationship developed with Israel, the United States and the United Kingdom, resulting in the 1986 U.S. bombing of Libya and United Nations–imposed economic sanctions. From 1999, Gaddafi shunned pan-Arabism, and encouraged pan-Africanism and rapprochement with Western nations; he was Chairperson of the African Union from 2009 to 2010. Amid the 2011 Arab Spring, protests against widespread corruption and unemployment broke out in eastern Libya. The situation descended into civil war, in which NATO intervened militarily on the side of the anti-Gaddafist National Transitional Council (NTC). Gaddafi's government was overthrown; he retreated to Sirte, only to be captured and killed by NTC militants.

A highly divisive figure, Gaddafi dominated Libya's politics for four decades and was the subject of a pervasive cult of personality. He was decorated with various awards and praised for his anti-imperialist stance, support for Arab—and then African—unity, as well as for significant development to the country following the discovery of oil reserves. Conversely, many Libyans strongly opposed Gaddafi's social and economic reforms; he was posthumously accused of various human rights violations. He was condemned by many as a dictator whose authoritarian administration systematically violated human rights and financed global terrorism in the region and abroad.

Early life and early career

Childhood: 1940s to 1950
Muammar Mohammed Abu Minyar al-Gaddafi was born near Qasr Abu Hadi, a rural area outside the town of Sirte in the deserts of Tripolitania, western Libya. Gaddafi is the only son of his parents and he is the youngest of four siblings. He had three older sisters. His family came from a small, relatively uninfluential tribe called the Qadhadhfa, who were Arab in heritage. His mother was named Aisha bin Niran (died 1978), and his father, Mohammad Abdul Salam bin Hamed bin Mohammad, was known as Abu Meniar (died 1985); the latter earned a meager subsistence as a goat and camel herder.

Like other contemporary nomadic Bedouin tribes, the family were illiterate and did not keep any birth records. Many biographers have used 7 June; however, his birthday is not known with certainty and sources have set it in 1942 or the spring of 1943, although his biographers David Blundy and Andrew Lycett noted that it could have been pre-1940.  Gaddafi's upbringing in Bedouin culture influenced his personal tastes for the rest of his life; he preferred the desert over the city and would retreat there to meditate.

From childhood, Gaddafi was aware of the involvement of European colonial powers in Libya; his nation was occupied by Italy, and during the North African Campaign of the Second World War it witnessed conflict between Italian and British forces. According to later claims, Gaddafi's paternal grandfather, Abdessalam Bouminyar, was killed by the Italian Army during the Italian invasion of 1911. At the end of the Second World War in 1945, Libya was occupied by British and French forces. Britain and France considered dividing the nation between their empires, but the General Assembly of the United Nations (UN) decided that the country was to be granted political independence, and in 1951 created the United Kingdom of Libya, a federal state under the leadership of a pro-Western monarch, Idris, who banned political parties and centralized power in his own hands.

Education and political activism: 1950–1963

Gaddafi's earliest education was of a religious nature, imparted by a local Islamic teacher. Subsequently, moving to nearby Sirte to attend elementary school, he progressed through six grades in four years. Education in Libya was not free, but his father thought it would greatly benefit his son despite the financial strain. During the week Gaddafi slept in a mosque, and at weekends walked  to visit his parents. At school, Gaddafi was bullied for being a Bedouin, but was proud of his identity and encouraged pride in other Bedouin children. From Sirte, he and his family moved to the market town of Sabha in Fezzan, south-central Libya, where his father worked as a caretaker for a tribal leader while Muammar attended secondary school, something neither parent had done. Gaddafi was popular at this school; some friends made there received significant jobs in his later administration, most notably his best friend, Abdul Salam Jalloud.

Many teachers at Sabha were Egyptian, and for the first time, Gaddafi had access to pan-Arab newspapers and radio broadcasts, especially the Cairo-based Voice of the Arabs. Growing up, Gaddafi witnessed significant events rock the Arab world, including the 1948 Arab–Israeli War, the Egyptian Revolution of 1952, the Suez Crisis of 1956, and the short-lived existence of the United Arab Republic (UAR) between 1958 and 1961. Gaddafi admired the political changes implemented in the Arab Republic of Egypt under his hero, President Gamal Abdel Nasser. Nasser argued for Arab nationalism; the rejection of Western colonialism, neo-colonialism, and Zionism; and a transition from capitalism to socialism. Gaddafi was influenced by Nasser's book, Philosophy of the Revolution, which outlined how to initiate a coup. One of Gaddafi's Egyptian teachers, Mahmoud Efay, was reportedly sympathetic towards the youth's political ideas, and advised him that a successful revolution would need the support of the army.

Gaddafi organized demonstrations and distributed posters criticizing the monarchy. In October 1961, he led a demonstration protesting against Syria's secession from the UAR, and raised funds to send cables of support to Nasser. Twenty students were arrested as a result of the disorder. Gaddafi and his companions also broke windows in a local hotel that was accused of serving alcohol. To punish Gaddafi, the authorities expelled him and his family from Sabha. Gaddafi moved to Misrata, there attending Misrata Secondary School. Maintaining his interest in Arab nationalist activism, he refused to join any of the banned political parties active in the city—including the Arab Nationalist Movement, the Arab Socialist Ba'ath Party, and the Muslim Brotherhood—claiming that he rejected factionalism. He read voraciously on the subjects of Nasser and the French Revolution of 1789, as well as the works of the Syrian political theorist Michel Aflaq and biographies of Abraham Lincoln, Sun Yat-sen, and Mustafa Kemal Atatürk.

Military training: 1963–1966
Gaddafi briefly studied history at the University of Libya in Benghazi before dropping out to join the military. Despite his police record, in 1963 he began training at the Royal Military Academy, Benghazi, alongside several like-minded friends from Misrata. The armed forces offered the only opportunity for upward social mobility for underprivileged Libyans, and Gaddafi recognized it as a potential instrument of political change. Under Idris, Libya's armed forces were trained by the British military; this angered Gaddafi, who viewed the British as imperialists, and accordingly, he refused to learn English and was rude to the British officers, ultimately failing his exams. British trainers reported him for insubordination and abusive behaviour, stating their suspicion that he was involved in the assassination of the military academy's commander in 1963. Such reports were ignored, and Gaddafi quickly progressed through the course.

With a group of loyal cadres, in 1964 Gaddafi established the Central Committee of the Free Officers Movement, a revolutionary group named after Nasser's Egyptian predecessor. Led by Gaddafi, they met secretively and were organized into a clandestine cell system, pooling their salaries into a single fund. Gaddafi travelled around Libya collecting intelligence and developing connections with sympathizers, but the government's intelligence services ignored him, considering him little threat. Graduating in August 1965, Gaddafi became a communications officer in the army's signal corps.

In April 1966, he was assigned to the United Kingdom for further training; over nine months he underwent an English-language course at Beaconsfield, Buckinghamshire, an Army Air Corps signal instructors course in Bovington Camp, Dorset, and an infantry signal instructors course at Hythe, Kent. Despite later rumours to the contrary, he did not attend the Royal Military Academy Sandhurst. The Bovington signal course's director reported that Gaddafi successfully overcame problems learning English, displaying a firm command of voice procedure. Noting that Gaddafi's favourite hobbies were reading and playing football, he thought him an "amusing officer, always cheerful, hard-working, and conscientious". Gaddafi disliked England, claiming British Army officers had racially insulted him and finding it difficult adjusting to the country's culture; asserting his Arab identity in London, he walked around Piccadilly wearing traditional Libyan robes. He later related that while he travelled to England believing it more advanced than Libya, he returned home "more confident and proud of our values, ideals and social character".

Libyan Arab Republic

Coup d'état: 1969

Idris' government was increasingly unpopular by the latter 1960s; it had exacerbated Libya's traditional regional and tribal divisions by centralizing the country's federal system to take advantage of the country's oil wealth. Corruption and entrenched systems of patronage were widespread throughout the oil industry. Arab nationalism was increasingly popular, and protests flared up following Egypt's 1967 defeat in the Six-Day War with Israel; Idris' administration was seen as pro-Israeli due to its alliance with the Western powers. Anti-Western riots broke out in Tripoli and Benghazi, while Libyan workers shut down oil terminals in solidarity with Egypt. By 1969, the US Central Intelligence Agency (CIA) was expecting segments of Libya's armed forces to launch a coup. Although claims have been made that they knew of Gaddafi's Free Officers Movement, they have since claimed ignorance, stating that they were instead monitoring Abdul Aziz Shalhi's Black Boots revolutionary group. Shalhi, who effectively served as Idris' chief of staff, and his brother Omar were the sons of Idris' former chief advisor Ibrahim Shalhi, who had been murdered by Queen Fatima's nephew in the fall of 1954. After their father's assassination, they became the favorites of Idris.

In mid-1969, Idris travelled abroad to spend the summer in Turkey and Greece amid widespread rumors of an abdication or a British-backed coup by the Shalhi brothers on 5 September. Gaddafi's Free Officers recognized this as their chance to overthrow the monarchy and preempt the Shalhi brothers, initiating "Operation Jerusalem". On 1 September, they occupied airports, police depots, radio stations, and government offices in Tripoli and Benghazi. Gaddafi took control of the Berka barracks in Benghazi, while Umar Muhayshi occupied Tripoli barracks and Jalloud seized the city's anti-aircraft batteries. Khweldi Hameidi took over the Tripoli radio station and was sent to arrest crown prince Sayyid Hasan ar-Rida al-Mahdi as-Sanussi and force him to relinquish his claim to the throne. They met no serious resistance and wielded little violence against the monarchists.

Once Gaddafi removed the monarchical government, he announced the foundation of the Libyan Arab Republic. Addressing the populace by radio, he proclaimed an end to the "reactionary and corrupt" regime, "the stench of which has sickened and horrified us all". Due to the coup's bloodless nature, it was initially labelled the "White Revolution", although was later renamed the "One September Revolution" after the date on which it occurred. Gaddafi insisted that the Free Officers' coup represented a revolution, marking the start of widespread change in the socio-economic and political nature of Libya. He proclaimed that the revolution meant "freedom, socialism, and unity", and over the coming years implemented measures to achieve this.

Consolidating leadership: 1969–1973
The 12-member central committee of the Free Officers proclaimed themselves the Revolutionary Command Council (RCC), the government of the new republic. Lieutenant Gaddafi became RCC chairman, and therefore the de facto head of state, also appointing himself to the rank of colonel and becoming commander-in-chief of the armed forces. Jalloud became Prime Minister, while a civilian Council of Ministers headed by Sulaiman Maghribi was founded to implement RCC policy. Libya's administrative capital was moved from al-Beida to Tripoli.

Although theoretically a collegial body operating through consensus building, Gaddafi dominated the RCC. Some of the others attempted to constrain what they saw as his excesses. Gaddafi remained the government's public face, with the identities of the other RCC members only being publicly revealed on 10 January 1970. All young men from (typically rural) working and middle-class backgrounds, none had university degrees; in this way they were distinct from the wealthy, highly educated conservatives who previously governed the country.

The coup completed, the RCC proceeded with their intentions of consolidating the revolutionary government and modernizing the country. They purged monarchists and members of Idris' Senussi clan from Libya's political world and armed forces; Gaddafi believed this elite were opposed to the will of the Libyan people and had to be expunged. People's Courts were founded to try various monarchist politicians and journalists, many of whom were imprisoned, although none executed. Idris was sentenced to execution in absentia. Three months after Gaddafi came to power, the army minister and interior minister, both of whom were from the eastern Barqa region, tried to overthrow him in a failed coup. In 1970, Idris' great nephew Ahmed al-Senussi tried to instigate another coup against Gaddafi; the monarchist plot was foiled in August and Ahmed was sentenced to death (commuted in 1988 and pardoned by Gaddafi in 2001).

In May 1970, the Revolutionary Intellectuals Seminar was held to bring intellectuals in line with the revolution, while that year's Legislative Review and Amendment united secular and religious law codes, introducing sharia into the legal system. Ruling by decree, the RCC maintained the monarchy's ban on political parties, in May 1970 banned trade unions, and in 1972 outlawed workers' strikes and suspended newspapers. In September 1971, Gaddafi resigned, claiming to be dissatisfied with the pace of reform, but returned to his position within a month. In July 1972, amid widespread speculation that Gaddafi had been ousted or jailed by his political opponents, a new 18-man cabinet was formed with only two of them, Jalloud and Abdel Moneim al-Houni, being military men; the rest were civilian technocrats per Gaddafi's insistence. In February 1973, Gaddafi resigned again, once more returning the following month.

Economic and social reform

The RCC's early economic policy has been characterized as being state capitalist in orientation. Many initiatives were established to aid entrepreneurs and develop a Libyan bourgeoisie. Seeking to expand the cultivatable acreage in Libya, in September 1969 the government launched a "Green Revolution" to increase agricultural productivity so that Libya could rely less on imported food. The hope was to make Libya self-sufficient in food production. All land that had either been expropriated from Italian settlers or which was not in use was repossessed and redistributed. Irrigation systems were established along the northern coastline and around various inland oases. Production costs often surpassed the value of the produce and thus Libyan agricultural production remained in deficit, relying heavily on state subsidies.

With crude oil as the country's primary export, Gaddafi sought to improve Libya's oil sector. In October 1969, he proclaimed the current trade terms unfair, benefiting foreign corporations more than the Libyan state, and threatened to decrease production. In December Jalloud successfully increased the price of Libyan oil. In 1970, other OPEC states followed suit, leading to a global increase in the price of crude oil. The RCC followed with the Tripoli Agreement of 20 March 1971, in which they secured income tax, back-payments and better pricing from the oil corporations; these measures brought Libya an estimated $1 billion in additional revenues in its first year.

Increasing state control over the oil sector, the RCC began a program of nationalization, starting with the expropriation of British Petroleum's share of the British Petroleum-N.B. Hunt Sahir Field in December 1971. In September 1973, it was announced that all foreign oil producers active in Libya were to see 51 per cent of their operation nationalized, including the stake of Nelson Bunker Hunt, son of H.L. Hunt, who had played a key role in the discovery of oil in Libya. Among the companies that were partially nationalized was Armand Hammer's Occidental Petroleum. For Gaddafi, this was an essential step towards socialism. It proved an economic success; while gross domestic product had been $3.8 billion in 1969, it had risen to $13.7 billion in 1974, and $24.5 billion in 1979. In turn, the Libyans' standard of life greatly improved over the first decade of Gaddafi's administration, and by 1979 the average per-capita income was at $8,170, up from $40 in 1951; this was above the average of many industrialized countries like Italy and the UK. In 1969, the government also declared that all foreign owned banks must either close down or convert to joint-stock operations.

The RCC implemented measures for social reform, adopting sharia as a basis. The consumption of alcohol was prohibited, night clubs and Christian churches were shut down, traditional Libyan dress was encouraged, and Arabic was decreed as the only language permitted in official communications and on road signs. The RCC doubled the minimum wage, introduced statutory price controls, and implemented compulsory rent reductions of between 30 and 40 per cent. Gaddafi also wanted to combat the strict social restrictions that had been imposed on women by the previous regime, establishing the Revolutionary Women's Formation to encourage reform. In 1970, a law was introduced affirming equality of the sexes and insisting on wage parity. In 1971, Gaddafi sponsored the creation of a Libyan General Women's Federation. In 1972, a law was passed criminalizing the marriage of any females under the age of sixteen and ensuring that a woman's consent was a necessary prerequisite for a marriage. Gaddafi's regime opened up a wide range of educational and employment opportunities for women, although these primarily benefited a minority in the urban middle-classes.

From 1969 to 1973, it used oil money to fund social welfare programs, which led to house-building projects and improved healthcare and education. House building became a major social priority, designed to eliminate homelessness and to replace the shanty towns created by Libya's growing urbanization. The health sector was also expanded; by 1978, Libya had 50 per cent more hospitals than it had in 1968, while the number of doctors had increased from 700 to over 3000 in that decade. Malaria was eradicated, and trachoma and tuberculosis greatly curtailed. Compulsory education was expanded from 6 to 9 years, while adult literacy programs and free university education were introduced. Beida University was founded, while Tripoli University and Benghazi University were expanded. In doing so, the government helped to integrate the poorer strata of Libyan society into the education system. Through these measures, the RCC greatly expanded the public sector, providing employment for thousands. These early social programs proved popular within Libya. This popularity was partly due to Gaddafi's personal charisma, youth and underdog status as a Bedouin, as well as his rhetoric emphasizing his role as the successor to the anti-Italian fighter Omar Mukhtar.

To combat the country's strong regional and tribal divisions, the RCC promoted the idea of a unified pan-Libyan identity. In doing so, they tried discrediting tribal leaders as agents of the old regime, and in August 1971 a Sabha military court tried many of them for counter-revolutionary activity. Long-standing administrative boundaries were re-drawn, crossing tribal boundaries, while pro-revolutionary modernizers replaced traditional leaders, yet the communities they served often rejected them. Realizing the failures of the modernizers, Gaddafi created the Arab Socialist Union (ASU) in June 1971, a mass mobilization vanguard party of which he was president. The ASU recognized the RCC as its "Supreme Leading Authority", and was designed to further revolutionary enthusiasm throughout the country. It remained heavily bureaucratic and failed to mobilize mass support in the way Gaddafi had envisioned.

Foreign relations

The influence of Nasser's Arab nationalism over the RCC was immediately apparent. The administration was instantly recognized by the neighbouring Arab nationalist regimes in Egypt, Syria, Iraq, and Sudan, with Egypt sending experts to aid the inexperienced RCC. Gaddafi propounded pan-Arab ideas, proclaiming the need for a single Arab state stretching across North Africa and the Middle East. In December 1969, Libya signed the Tripoli Charter alongside Egypt and Sudan. This established the Arab Revolutionary Front, a pan-national union designed as a first step towards the eventual political unification of the three nations. In 1970 Syria declared its intention to join.

Nasser died unexpectedly in September 1970, with Gaddafi playing a prominent role at his funeral. Nasser was succeeded by Anwar Sadat, who suggested that rather than creating a unified state, the Arab states should create a political federation, implemented in April 1971; in doing so, Egypt, Syria, and Sudan received large grants of Libyan oil money. In July 1971, Gaddafi sided with Sadat against the Soviet Union in the 1971 Sudanese coup d'état and dispatched Libyan fighter jets to force down a British Airlines jetliner carrying the leading coup plotters, Farouk Osman Hamadallah and Babikir al-Nour. They were extradited back to Khartoum, where they were promptly executed by Sudanese leader Jaafar Nimeiry. In February 1972, Gaddafi and Sadat signed an unofficial charter of merger, but it was never implemented because relations broke down the following year. Sadat became increasingly wary of Libya's radical direction, and the September 1973 deadline for implementing the Federation passed by with no action taken.

After the 1969 coup, representatives of the Four Powers—France, the United Kingdom, the United States, and the Soviet Union—were called to meet RCC representatives. The UK and the US quickly extended diplomatic recognition, hoping to secure the position of their military bases in Libya and fearing further instability. Hoping to ingratiate themselves with Gaddafi, in 1970 the US informed him of at least one planned counter-coup. Such attempts to form a working relationship with the RCC failed; Gaddafi was determined to reassert national sovereignty and expunge what he described as foreign colonial and imperialist influences. His administration insisted that the US and the UK remove their military bases from Libya, with Gaddafi proclaiming that "the armed forces which rose to express the people's revolution [will not] tolerate living in their shacks while the bases of imperialism exist in Libyan territory." The British left in March and the Americans in June 1970.

Moving to reduce Italian influence, in October 1970 all Italian-owned assets were expropriated, and the 12,000-strong Italian community was expelled from Libya alongside the smaller community of Libyan Jews. The day became a national holiday known as "Vengeance Day". Italy complained that this was in contravention of the 1956 Italo-Libyan Treaty, although no UN sanctions were forthcoming. Aiming to reduce NATO power in the Mediterranean, in 1971 Libya requested that Malta cease allowing NATO to use its land for a military base, in turn offering Malta foreign aid. Compromising, Malta's government continued allowing NATO to use the island, but only on the condition that NATO would not use it for launching attacks on Arab territory. Over the coming decade, Gaddafi's government developed stronger political and economic links with Dom Mintoff's Maltese administration, and under Libya's urging Malta did not renew the UK's airbases on the island in 1980. Orchestrating a military build-up, the RCC began purchasing weapons from France and the Soviet Union. The commercial relationship with the latter led to an increasingly strained relationship with the US, which was then engaged in the Cold War with the Soviets.

Gaddafi was especially critical of the US due to its support of Israel, and sided with the Palestinians in the Israeli–Palestinian conflict, viewing the 1948 creation of the State of Israel as a Western colonial occupation forced upon the Arab world. He believed that Palestinian violence against Israeli and Western targets was the justified response of an oppressed people who were fighting against the colonization of their homeland. Calling on the Arab states to wage "continuous war" against Israel, in 1970 he initiated a Jihad Fund to finance anti-Israeli militants. In June 1972 Gaddafi created the First Nasserite Volunteers Centre to train anti-Israeli guerrillas.

Like Nasser, Gaddafi favoured the Palestinian leader Yasser Arafat and his group, Fatah, over more militant and Marxist Palestinian groups. As the years progressed however, Gaddafi's relationship with Arafat became strained, with Gaddafi considering him too moderate and calling for more violent action. Instead, he supported militias like the Popular Front for the Liberation of Palestine, Popular Front for the Liberation of Palestine – General Command, the Democratic Front for the Liberation of Palestine, As-Sa'iqa, the Palestinian Popular Struggle Front, and the Abu Nidal Organization. He funded the Black September Organization whose members perpetrated the 1972 Munich massacre of Israeli athletes in West Germany and had the killed militants' bodies flown to Libya for a hero's funeral.

Gaddafi financially supported other militant groups across the world, including the Black Panther Party, the Nation of Islam, the Almighty Black P. Stone Nation, the Tupamaros, the 19th of April Movement and the Sandinista National Liberation Front in Nicaragua, the ANC among other liberation movements in the fight against Apartheid in South Africa, the Provisional Irish Republican Army, ETA, Action directe, the Red Brigades, and the Red Army Faction in Europe, and the Armenian Secret Army, the Japanese Red Army, the Free Aceh Movement, and the Moro National Liberation Front in the Philippines. Gaddafi was indiscriminate in the causes which he funded, sometimes switching from supporting one side in a conflict to the other, as in the Eritrean War of Independence. Throughout the 1970s these groups received financial support from Libya, which came to be seen as a leader in the Third World's struggle against colonialism and neocolonialism. Though many of these groups were labelled "terrorists" by critics of their activities, Gaddafi rejected this characterization, instead considering them to be revolutionaries who were engaged in liberation struggles.

The "Popular Revolution": 1973–1977

On 16 April 1973, Gaddafi proclaimed the start of a "Popular Revolution" in a speech at Zuwarah. He initiated this with a five-point plan, the first point of which dissolved all existing laws, to be replaced by revolutionary enactments. The second point proclaimed that all opponents of the revolution had to be removed, while the third initiated an administrative revolution that Gaddafi proclaimed would remove all traces of bureaucracy and the bourgeoisie. The fourth point announced that the population must form People's Committees and be armed to defend the revolution, while the fifth proclaimed the beginning of the Cultural Revolution in Libya, to expunge the country of "poisonous" foreign influences. He began to lecture on this new phase of the revolution in Libya, Egypt, and France. As a process, it had many similarities with the Cultural Revolution implemented in China.

As part of this Popular Revolution, Gaddafi invited Libya's people to found General People's Committees as conduits for raising political consciousness. Although offering little guidance for how to set up these councils, Gaddafi claimed that they would offer a form of direct political participation that was more democratic than a traditional party-based representative system. He hoped that the councils would mobilize the people behind the RCC, erode the power of the traditional leaders and the bureaucracy, and allow for a new legal system chosen by the people. Many such committees were established in schools and colleges, where they were responsible for vetting staff, courses, and textbooks to determine if they were compatible with the country's revolutionary ideology.

The People's Committees led to a high percentage of public involvement in decision making, within the limits permitted by the RCC, but exacerbated tribal divisions and tensions. They also served as a surveillance system, aiding the security services in locating individuals with views critical of the RCC, leading to the arrest of Ba'athists, Marxists, and Islamists. Operating in a pyramid structure, the base form of these Committees were local working groups, who sent elected representatives to the district level, and from there to the national level, divided between the General People's Congress and the General People's Committee. Above these remained Gaddafi and the RCC, who remained responsible for all major decisions. In crossing regional and tribal identities, the committee system aided national integration and centralization and tightened Gaddafi's control over the state and administrative apparatus.

Third International Theory and The Green Book 

In June 1973, Gaddafi created a political ideology as a basis for the Popular Revolution: Third International Theory. This approach regarded both the US and the Soviet Union as imperialist and thus rejected Western capitalism as well as Marxist-Leninist atheism. In this respect, it was similar to the Three Worlds Theory developed by China's political leader Mao Zedong. As part of this theory, Gaddafi praised nationalism as a progressive force and advocated the creation of a pan-Arab state which would lead the Islamic and Third Worlds against imperialism. Gaddafi saw Islam as having a key role in this ideology, calling for an Islamic revival that returned to the origins of the Qur'an, rejecting scholarly interpretations and the Hadith; in doing so, he angered many Libyan clerics. During 1973 and 1974, his government deepened the legal reliance on sharia, for instance by introducing flogging as punishment for those convicted of adultery or homosexual activity.

Gaddafi summarized Third International Theory in three short volumes published between 1975 and 1979, collectively known as The Green Book. Volume one was devoted to the issue of democracy, outlining the flaws of representative systems in favour of direct, participatory GPCs. The second dealt with Gaddafi's beliefs regarding socialism, while the third explored social issues regarding the family and the tribe. While the first two volumes advocated radical reform, the third adopted a socially conservative stance, proclaiming that while men and women were equal, they were biologically designed for different roles in life. During the years that followed, Gaddafists adopted quotes from The Green Book, such as "Representation is Fraud", as slogans. Meanwhile, in September 1975, Gaddafi implemented further measures to increase popular mobilization, introducing objectives to improve the relationship between the Councils and the ASU.

In 1975, Gaddafi's government declared a state monopoly on foreign trade. Its increasingly radical reforms, coupled with the large amount of oil revenue being spent on foreign causes, generated discontent in Libya, particularly among the country's merchant class. In 1974, Libya saw its first civilian attack on Gaddafi's government when a Benghazi army building was bombed. Much of the opposition centred around RCC member Umar Muhayshi. With fellow RCC members Bashir Saghir al-Hawaadi and Awad Ali Hamza, he began plotting a coup against Gaddafi. In 1975, their plot was exposed and Muhayshi fled to Tunisia, eventually receiving asylum from Sadat's Egypt. Hawaadi, Hamza, and Omar El-Hariri were arrested. Most of the other conspirators were executed in March 1976. Another RCC member, foreign minister Abdul-Munim al-Huni, also fled to Egypt. In the aftermath, only five RCC members remained: Gaddafi, Jalloud, Abu-Bakr Yunis Jabr, Mustafa Kharubi, and Kweldi al-Hamidi. Thus, power was further concentrated in Gaddafi's hands. This ultimately led to the RCC's official abolition in March 1977.

In September 1975, Gaddafi purged the army, arresting around 200 senior officers, and in October he founded the clandestine Office for the Security of the Revolution. In April 1976, he called upon his supporters in universities to establish "revolutionary student councils" and drive out "reactionary elements". During that year, anti-Gaddafist student demonstrations broke out at the universities of Tripoli and Benghazi, resulting in clashes with both Gaddafist students and police. The RCC responded with mass arrests and introduced compulsory national service for young people. In January 1977, two dissenting students and a number of army officers were publicly hanged; Amnesty International condemned it as the first time in Gaddafist Libya that dissenters had been executed for purely political crimes. Dissent also arose from conservative clerics and the Muslim Brotherhood, who accused Gaddafi of moving towards Marxism and criticized his abolition of private property as being against the Islamic sunnah; these forces were then persecuted as anti-revolutionary, while all privately owned Islamic colleges and universities were shut down.

Foreign relations

Following Anwar Sadat's ascension to the Egyptian presidency, Libya's relations with Egypt deteriorated. Over the coming years, the two slipped into a state of cold war. Sadat was perturbed by Gaddafi's unpredictability and insistence that Egypt required a cultural revolution akin to that being carried out in Libya. In February 1973, Israeli forces shot down Libyan Arab Airlines Flight 114, which had strayed from Egyptian airspace into Israeli-held territory during a sandstorm. Gaddafi's foreign minister Salah Busir was on board and allegedly targeted by Israel in retaliation for the Munich massacre. Gaddafi was infuriated that Egypt had not done more to prevent the incident, and in retaliation planned to destroy the Queen Elizabeth 2, a British ship chartered by American Jews to sail to Haifa for Israel's 25th anniversary. Gaddafi ordered an Egyptian submarine to target the ship, but Sadat cancelled the order, fearing a military escalation.

Gaddafi was later infuriated when Egypt and Syria planned the Yom Kippur War against Israel without consulting him and was angered when Egypt conceded to peace talks rather than continuing the war. Gaddafi became openly hostile to Egypt's leader, calling for Sadat's overthrow. When Sudanese President Gaafar Nimeiry took Sadat's side, Gaddafi also spoke out against him, encouraging the Sudan People's Liberation Army's attempt to overthrow Nimeiry. In 1974, Gaddafi released Abdul-Aziz Shennib, a commander under King Idris, from prison and appointed him Libyan ambassador to Jordan. Shennib had attended the Royal Military Academy Sandhurst with King Hussein of Jordan and was tasked by Gaddafi with Hussein's assassination. Shennib instead informed Hussein of the plot and defected to Jordan. Relations with Syria also soured over the events in the Lebanese Civil War. Initially, both Libya and Syria had contributed troops to the Arab League's peacekeeping force, although after the Syrian army attacked the Lebanese National Movement, Gaddafi openly accused Syrian President Hafez al-Assad of "national treason"; he was the only Arab leader to criticize Syria's actions. In late 1972 and early 1973, Libya invaded Chad to annex the uranium-rich Aouzou Strip.

Intent on propagating Islam, in 1973 Gaddafi founded the Islamic Call Society, which had opened 132 centres across Africa within a decade. In 1973 he converted Gabonese President Omar Bongo, an action which he repeated three years later with Jean-Bédel Bokassa, president of the Central African Republic. Between 1973 and 1979, Libya provided $500 million in aid to African countries, namely to Zaire and Uganda, and founded joint-venture companies throughout the countries to aid trade and development. Gaddafi was also keen on reducing Israeli influence within Africa, using financial incentives to successfully convince eight African states to break off diplomatic relations with Israel in 1973.

A strong relationship was also established between Gaddafi's Libya and Prime Minister Zulfikar Ali Bhutto's Pakistani government, with the two countries exchanging nuclear research and military assistance. In recognition of Gaddafi's  support of Pakistan's right to pursue nuclear weapons and financial support for the "Islamic bomb," Lahore Stadium was renamed Gaddafi Stadium. Gaddafi also provided support for Pakistan in the Bangladesh Liberation War; he reportedly deployed F-5s to Sargodha AFB and penned a strongly worded letter to Indian Prime Minister Indira Gandhi accusing her of aggression against Pakistan. After the first president of Bangladesh, Sheikh Mujibur Rahman, was assassinated in 1975, Gaddafi provided refuge and lucrative business opportunities in Libya for two of the assassins, Syed Faruque Rahman and Khandaker Abdur Rashid. Gaddafi's strong relationship with Pakistan ended after Bhutto was deposed by Muhammad Zia-ul-Haq in 1977 as Zia distrusted Gaddafi and rejected further Libyan financing for the Pakistani nuclear program in favor of Saudi financing.

Gaddafi sought to develop closer links in the Maghreb; in January 1974 Libya and Tunisia announced a political union, the Arab Islamic Republic. Although advocated by Gaddafi and Tunisian President Habib Bourguiba, the move was deeply unpopular in Tunisia, and it was soon abandoned. Retaliating, Gaddafi sponsored anti-government militants in Tunisia into the 1980s. Turning his attention to Algeria, in 1975 Libya signed, in Hassi Messaoud, a defensive alliance allegedly to counter alleged "Moroccan expansionism", also funding the Polisario Front of Western Sahara in its independence struggle against Morocco. Seeking to diversify Libya's economy, Gaddafi's government began purchasing shares in major European corporations like Fiat as well as buying real estate in Malta and Italy, which would become a valuable source of income during the 1980s oil slump.

Great Socialist People's Libyan Arab Jamahiriya

Foundation: 1977

On 2 March 1977, the General People's Congress adopted the "Declaration on the Establishment of the Authority of the People" at Gaddafi's behest. Dissolving the Libyan Arab Republic, it was replaced by the Great Socialist People's Libyan Arab Jamahiriya, a "state of the masses" conceptualized by Gaddafi. A new, all-green banner was adopted as the country's flag. Officially, the Jamahiriya was a direct democracy in which the people ruled themselves through the 187 Basic People's Congresses (BPCs), where all adult Libyans participated and voted on national decisions. These then sent members to the annual General People's Congress, which was broadcast live on television. In principle, the People's Congresses were Libya's highest authority, with major decisions proposed by government officials or with Gaddafi himself requiring the consent of the People's Congresses. Gaddafi became General Secretary of the GPC, although he stepped down from this position in early 1979 and appointed himself "Leader of the Revolution".

Although all political control was officially vested in the People's Congresses, in reality Libya's existing political leadership continued to exercise varying degrees of power and influence. Debate remained limited, and major decisions regarding the economy and defence were avoided or dealt with cursorily; the GPC largely remained "a rubber stamp" for Gaddafi's policies. On rare occasions, the GPC opposed Gaddafi's suggestions, sometimes successfully; notably, when Gaddafi called on primary schools to be abolished, believing that homeschooling was healthier for children, the GPC rejected the idea. In other instances, Gaddafi pushed through laws without the GPC's support, such as when he desired to allow women into the armed forces. At other times, he ordered snap elections when it appeared that the GPC would enact laws he opposed. Gaddafi proclaimed that the People's Congresses provided for Libya's every political need, rendering other political organizations unnecessary; all non-authorized groups, including political parties, professional associations, independent trade unions, and women's groups, were banned. Despite these restrictions, St. John noted that the Jamahiriya system still "introduced a level of representation and participation hitherto unknown in Libya".

With preceding legal institutions abolished, Gaddafi envisioned the Jamahiriya as following the Qur'an for legal guidance, adopting sharia law; he proclaimed "man-made" laws unnatural and dictatorial, only permitting Allah's law. Within a year he was backtracking, announcing that sharia was inappropriate for the Jamahiriya because it guaranteed the protection of private property, contravening The Green Book socialism. His emphasis on placing his own work on a par with the Qur'an led conservative clerics to accuse him of shirk, furthering their opposition to his regime. In July 1977, a border war broke out with Egypt, in which the Egyptians defeated Libya despite their technological inferiority. The conflict lasted one week before both sides agreed to sign a peace treaty that was brokered by several Arab states. Both Egypt and Sudan had aligned themselves with the US, and this pushed Libya into a strategic, although not political, alignment with the Soviet Union. In recognition of the growing commercial relationship between Libya and the Soviets, Gaddafi was invited to visit Moscow in December 1976; there, he entered talks with Leonid Brezhnev. In August 1977, he visited Yugoslavia, where he met its leader Josip Broz Tito, with whom he had a much warmer relationship. He also enjoyed a warm relationship with the communist dictator of Romania, Nicolae Ceaușescu. According to Romanian spy chief Ion Mihai Pacepa, Gaddafi once exclaimed to Ceaușescu, "My brother! You are my brother for the rest of my life!" After Pacepa defected to the US in July 1978, Gaddafi and Yasser Arafat contributed $1 million each to Ceaușescu's $4 million bounty on Pacepa.

Revolutionary Committees and furthering socialism: 1978–1980

In December 1978, Gaddafi stepped down as Secretary-General of the GPC, announcing his new focus on revolutionary rather than governmental activities; this was part of his new emphasis on separating the apparatus of the revolution from the government. Although no longer in a formal governmental post, he adopted the title of "Leader of the Revolution" and continued as commander-in-chief of the armed forces. The historian Dirk Vandewalle stated that despite the Jamahariya's claims to being a direct democracy, Libya remained "an exclusionary political system whose decision-making process" was "restricted to a small cadre of advisers and confidantes" surrounding Gaddafi.

Libya began to turn towards socialism. In March 1978, the government issued guidelines for housing redistribution, attempting to ensure that every adult Libyan owned their own home. Most families were banned from owning more than one house, while former rental properties were expropriated by the state and sold to the tenants at a heavily subsidized price. In September, Gaddafi called for the People's Committees to eliminate the "bureaucracy of the public sector" and the "dictatorship of the private sector"; the People's Committees took control of several hundred companies, converting them into worker cooperatives run by elected representatives.

On 2 March 1979, the GPC announced the separation of government and revolution, the latter being represented by new Revolutionary Committees, who operated in tandem with the People's Committees in schools, universities, unions, the police force, and the military. Dominated by revolutionary zealots, most of whom were youths, the Revolutionary Committees were led by Mohammad Maghgoub and a Central Coordinating Office based in Tripoli and met with Gaddafi annually. Membership of the Revolutionary Committees was drawn from within the BPCs. According to Bearman, the revolutionary committee system became "a key—if not the main—mechanism through which [Gaddafi] exercises political control in Libya". Publishing a weekly magazine The Green March (al-Zahf al-Akhdar), in October 1980 they took control of the press. Responsible for perpetuating revolutionary fervour, they performed ideological surveillance, later adopting a significant security role, making arrests and putting people on trial according to the "law of the revolution" (qanun al-thawra). With no legal code or safeguards, the administration of revolutionary justice was largely arbitrary and resulted in widespread abuses and the suppression of civil liberties: the "Green Terror".

In 1979, the committees began the redistribution of land in the Jefara plain, continuing through 1981. In May 1980, measures to redistribute and equalize wealth were implemented; anyone with over 1000 dinar in their bank account saw that extra money expropriated. The following year, the GPC announced that the government would take control of all import, export and distribution functions, with state supermarkets replacing privately owned businesses; this led to a decline in the availability of consumer goods and the development of a thriving black market. Gaddafi was also frustrated by the slow pace of social reform on women's issues, and in 1979 launched a Revolutionary Women's Formation to replace the more gradualist Libyan General Women's Federation. In 1978 he had established a Women's Military Academy in Tripoli, encouraging all women to enlist for training. The measure was hugely controversial, and voted down by the GPC in February 1983. Gaddafi remained adamant, and when it was again voted down by the GPC in March 1984, he refused to abide by the decision, declaring that "he who opposes the training and emancipation of women is an agent of imperialism, whether he likes it or not."

The Jamahiriya'''s radical direction earned the government many enemies. Most internal opposition came from Islamic fundamentalists, who were inspired by the events of the 1979 Iranian Revolution. In February 1978, Gaddafi discovered that his head of military intelligence was plotting to kill him, and began to increasingly entrust security to his Qadhadfa tribe. Many who had seen their wealth and property confiscated turned against the administration, and a number of Western-funded opposition groups were founded by exiles. Most prominent was the National Front for the Salvation of Libya (NFSL), founded in 1981 by Mohammed Magariaf, which orchestrated militant attacks against Libya's government. Another, al-Borkan, began killing Libyan diplomats abroad. Following Gaddafi's command to kill these "stray dogs", under Colonel Younis Bilgasim's leadership, the Revolutionary Committees set up overseas branches to suppress counter-revolutionary activity, assassinating various dissidents. Although nearby nations like Syria and Israel also employed hit squads, Gaddafi was unusual in publicly bragging about his administration's use of them; in April 1980, he ordered all dissidents to return home by June 10 or be "liquidated wherever you are". Within a three months period in 1980, at least ten Libyan dissidents were murdered in Europe, including ex-diplomats, ex-army officers, businessmen, journalists, and student activists in disparate locations such as Rome, Bonn, London, Greece, Austria, and Cyprus. At least eleven more dissidents were assassinated abroad in 1981. In November 1984, Gaddafi was tricked by Egyptian President Hosni Mubarak into announcing the successful assassination of former Libyan Prime Minister Abdul Hamid al-Bakkoush in Cairo; Bakkhoush not only turned up alive but held a press conference with Egypt's Interior Minister. In 1979, Gaddafi also created the Islamic Legion, through which several thousand Africans were trained in military tactics.

Libya had sought to improve relations with the US under the presidency of Jimmy Carter, for instance by courting his brother, the businessman Billy Carter, and paying for the services of a group of rogue former CIA officers led by Edwin P. Wilson, but in 1979 the US placed Libya on its list of "State Sponsors of Terrorism". Relations were further damaged at the end of the year when a demonstration torched the US embassy in Tripoli in solidarity with the perpetrators of the Iran hostage crisis. The following year, Libyan fighters began intercepting US fighter jets flying over the Mediterranean, signalling the collapse of relations between the two countries. Major sources in the Italian media have alleged that the Itavia Flight 870 was shot down during a dogfight involving Libyan, United States, French and Italian Air Force fighters in an assassination attempt by NATO members on an important Libyan politician, perhaps even Gaddafi, who was flying in the same airspace that evening.The Mystery of Flight 870 , The Guardian, 21 July 2006

Libyan relations with Lebanon and Shi'ite communities across the world also deteriorated due to the August 1978 disappearance of imam Musa al-Sadr when visiting Libya; the Lebanese accused Gaddafi of having him killed or imprisoned, a charge he denied. Relations with Pakistan broke down in this period. Despite Gaddafi's repeated appeals to Muhammad Zia-ul-Haq to spare Zulfikar Ali Bhutto's life, Bhutto was executed in April 1979. In retaliation for Bhutto's execution and Zia's refusal to share Pakistan's nuclear technology with Libya, Gaddafi began training Al-Zulfiqar, an anti-Zia insurgency led by Bhutton's sons Murtaza and Shahnawaz, expelled all 150,000 Pakistanis living in Libya, and provided asylum for the Bhutto family. Relations with Syria improved, as Gaddafi and Syrian President Hafez al-Assad shared an enmity with Israel and Egypt's Sadat. In 1980, they proposed a political union, with Libya promising to pay off Syria's £1-billion debt to the Soviet Union; although pressures led Assad to pull out, they remained allies. Another key ally was Uganda, and in 1979, during the Uganda–Tanzania War, Gaddafi sent 2,500 troops into Uganda to defend the regime of President Idi Amin from Tanzanian invaders. The mission failed; 400 Libyans were killed and they were forced to retreat. Gaddafi later came to regret his alliance with Amin, openly criticizing him as a "fascist" and a "show-off".

Conflict with the US and its allies: 1981–1986

The early and mid-1980s saw economic trouble for Libya; from 1982 to 1986, the country's annual oil revenues dropped from $21 billion to $5.4 billion. Focusing on irrigation projects, 1983 saw construction start on Libya's largest and most expensive infrastructure project, the Great Man-Made River; although designed to be finished by the end of the decade, it remained incomplete at the start of the 21st century. Military spending increased, while other administrative budgets were cut back. Libya's foreign debt rose, and austerity measures were introduced to promote self-reliance; in August 1985 there was a mass deportation of foreign workers, most of them Egyptian and Tunisian. Domestic threats continued to plague Gaddafi; in May 1984, his Bab al-Azizia home was unsuccessfully attacked by a militia—linked either to the NFSL or the Muslim Brotherhood—and in the aftermath 5,000 dissidents were arrested. In the spring of 1985, members of the military tried to assassinate Gaddafi twice. The first attempt was a plot by conservative officers to assassinate Gaddafi at one of his villas on the outskirts of Tripoli; the second attempt was an assault on his convoy. In November 1985, Colonel Hassan Ishkal, the third powerful man in Libya, head of the military region of Sirte, and a distant cousin of Gaddafi, died in a suspicious car accident. Ishkal's death was attributed to Jalloud, Khalifa Hunaysh (d. 2012), or Gaddafi himself.

Libya had long supported the FROLINAT militia in neighbouring Chad, but the FROLINAT itself became divided over its ties to Libya in 1976. In January 1978, the anti-Libya faction within FROLINAT, led by Hissène Habré, switched side and formed an alliance with Chadian President Félix Malloum. Sudan and Saudi Arabia played a role in the negotiation due to their desire to contain Gaddafi.R. Buijtenhuijs, "Le FROLINAT à l'épreuve du pouvoir", p. 19 Meanwhile, the pro-Libya faction within FROLINAT, led by Goukouni Oueddei, renamed itself People's Armed Forces (FAP). In December 1980, Gaddafi re-invaded Chad at the request of the FAP-controlled GUNT government to aid in the civil war; in January 1981, Gaddafi suggested a political merger. The Organisation of African Unity (OAU) rejected this and called for a Libyan withdrawal, which came about in November 1981. The civil war resumed, and so Libya sent troops back in, clashing with French forces who supported the southern Chadian forces.

In 1982, the GUNT government was overthrown by Habré's forces and Oueddei fled to Libya, where Gaddafi provided him with arms to continue to wage guerrilla warfare against Habré. In November 1984, Gaddafi met with French President François Mitterrand in Crete, where both sides agreed to withdraw from Chad. Oueddei broke with Gaddafi in 1985 due to the former's intentions to negotiate a truce with Habré. Consequently, he was placed under house arrest by Gaddafi in August and allegedly arrested by Libyan police and shot in the stomach in October.James Brooke, "Chad said to win vast Libyan booty" , The New York Times, 1 April 1987. Oueddei survived the shooting and fled to Algeria, but continued to claim he and Gaddafi enjoyed a good relationship. When Gaddafi ordered the remnant of GUNT to attack Habré in February 1986 in violation of his agreement with Mitterand, France immediately launched Operation Épervier, which escalated into the Toyota War. Libya suffered a humiliating defeat as it was completely expelled from Chad and its chief commander, Khalifa Haftar, was captured along with 600-700 Libyan soldiers. Shortly after this disastrous battle, Gaddafi disavowed Haftar and the other Libyan prisoners of war who were captured by Chad. One possible contributing factor to Gaddafi's repudiation of Haftar and of other captured prisoners of war may have been the fact that Gaddafi had earlier signed an agreement to withdraw all Libyan forces from Chad, and Haftar's operations inside of Chad had been in violation of this agreement. An embittered Haftar then joined the anti-Gaddafi National Front for the Salvation of Libya, became a CIA asset, and eventually was given refuge in the US.

Many African nations were tired of Libya's interference in their affairs; by 1980, nine African states had severed diplomatic relations with Libya, while in 1982 the OAU cancelled its scheduled conference in Tripoli to prevent Gaddafi gaining chairmanship. Some African states, such as Jerry Rawlings's Ghana and Thomas Sankara's Burkina Faso, nevertheless had warm relations with Libya during the 1980s.

Proposing political unity with Morocco, in August 1984, Gaddafi and Moroccan monarch Hassan II signed the Oujda Treaty, forming the Arab–African Union; such a union was considered surprising due to the strong political differences and longstanding enmity that existed between the two governments. In a sign of warming relations, Gaddafi promised to stop funding the Polisario Front and Hassan II extradited former RCC member Umar Muhayshi to Libya, where he was immediately killed. Relations remained strained, particularly due to Morocco's friendly relations with the US and Israel; in August 1986, Hassan abolished the union. Angered by the snub, Gaddafi plotted with Abu Nidal to assassinate Hassan in 1987, but the plot was later aborted.

In 1981, the new US President, Ronald Reagan, pursued a hardline approach to Libya, viewing it as a puppet regime of the Soviet Union. Gaddafi played up his commercial relationship with the Soviets, revisiting Moscow in 1981 and 1985, and threatening to join the Warsaw Pact. The Soviets were nevertheless cautious of Gaddafi, seeing him as an unpredictable extremist. In August 1981, the US staged military exercises in the Gulf of Sirte – an area which Libya claimed as a part of its territorial waters. The US shot down two Libyan Su-22 planes which were on an intercept course. Closing down Libya's embassy in Washington, DC, Reagan advised US companies operating in Libya to reduce the number of American personnel stationed there. In December 1981, the White House claimed Gaddafi had dispatched a hit squad to assassinate Reagan, allegedly led by Carlos the Jackal, who had been living in Libya under Gaddafi's protection after the 1975 OPEC siege. Secretary of State Alexander Haig, Defense Secretary Caspar Weinberger, Counselor to the President Edwin Meese, chief of staff James Baker, and deputy chief of staff Michael Deaver were also considered potential targets and thus given special security. US ambassador to Italy Maxwell M. Rabb, who was Jewish, was urgently recalled to Washington due to threats against his life. Gaddafi denied the allegations. Gaddafi was also accused of having ties to the Lebanese Armed Revolutionary Factions, which had murdered US military attaché Charles R. Ray and Israeli diplomat Yacov Barsimantov in Paris. In March 1982, the US implemented an embargo of Libyan oil, and in January 1986 ordered all US companies to cease operating in the country, although several hundred workers remained when the Libyan government doubled their pay. In Spring 1986, the US Navy again performed exercises in the Gulf of Sirte; the Libyan military retaliated, but failed as the US sank several Libyan ships. Diplomatic relations also broke down with the UK, after Libyan diplomats were accused in the killing of Yvonne Fletcher, a British policewoman stationed outside their London embassy, in April 1984.

In 1980, Gaddafi hired former CIA agent Edwin P. Wilson, who was living in Libya as a fugitive from US justice, to plot the murder of an anti-Gaddafi Libyan graduate student at Colorado State University named Faisal Zagallai. Zagallai was shot in the head twice on October 14, 1980 in Fort Collins, Colorado by a former Green Beret and associate of Wilson named Eugene Tafoya. Zagallai survived the attack and Tafoya was convicted of third-degree assault and conspiracy to commit assault in November 1981. Wilson was lured back to the US and sentenced to 32 years in prison over four separate trials due to his ties to Gaddafi in 1983. In 1984, Gaddafi publicly executed Al-Sadek Hamed Al-Shuwehdy, a student and aeronautical engineer studying in the US.

After the US accused Libya of orchestrating the 1986 Berlin discotheque bombing, in which two American soldiers died, Reagan decided to retaliate militarily. The CIA was critical of the move, believing that Syria was a greater threat and that an attack would strengthen Gaddafi's reputation; however Libya was recognized as a "soft target". Reagan was supported by the UK but opposed by other European allies, who argued that it would contravene international law. In Operation El Dorado Canyon, orchestrated on 15 April 1986, US military planes launched a series of air-strikes on Libya, bombing military installations in various parts of the country, killing around 100 Libyans, including several civilians. One of the targets had been Gaddafi's home. Himself unharmed, two of Gaddafi's sons were injured, and he claimed that his four-year-old adopted daughter Hanna was killed, although her existence has since been questioned. In the immediate aftermath, Gaddafi retreated to the desert to meditate. There were sporadic clashes between Gaddafists and army officers who wanted to overthrow the government. Although the US was condemned internationally, Reagan received a popularity boost at home. Publicly lambasting US imperialism, Gaddafi's reputation as an anti-imperialist was strengthened both domestically and across the Arab world, and, in June 1986, he ordered the names of the month to be changed in Libya.

"Revolution within a Revolution": 1987–1998

The late 1980s saw a series of liberalizing economic reforms within Libya designed to cope with the decline in oil revenues. In May 1987, Gaddafi announced the start of the "Revolution within a Revolution", which began with reforms to industry and agriculture and saw the re-opening of small business. Restrictions were placed on the activities of the Revolutionary Committees; in March 1988, their role was narrowed by the newly created Ministry for Mass Mobilization and Revolutionary Leadership to restrict their violence and judicial role, while in August 1988 Gaddafi publicly criticized them.
In March, hundreds of political prisoners were freed, with Gaddafi falsely claiming that there were no further political prisoners in Libya. In June, Libya's government issued the Great Green Charter on Human Rights in the Era of the Masses, in which 27 articles laid out goals, rights, and guarantees to improve the situation of human rights in Libya, restricting the use of the death penalty and calling for its eventual abolition. Many of the measures suggested in the charter would be implemented the following year, although others remained inactive. Also in 1989, the government founded the Al-Gaddafi International Prize for Human Rights, to be awarded to figures from the Third World who had struggled against colonialism and imperialism; the first year's winner was South African anti-apartheid activist Nelson Mandela. From 1994 through to 1997, the government initiated cleansing committees to root out corruption, particularly in the economic sector.

In the aftermath of the 1986 US attack, the army was purged of perceived disloyal elements, and in 1988, Gaddafi announced the creation of a popular militia to replace the army and police. In 1987, Libya began production of mustard gas at a facility in Rabta, although publicly denied it was stockpiling chemical weapons, and unsuccessfully attempted to develop nuclear weapons. The period also saw a growth in domestic Islamist opposition, formulated into groups like the Muslim Brotherhood and the Libyan Islamic Fighting Group. Several assassination attempts against Gaddafi were foiled, and in turn, 1989 saw the security forces raid mosques believed to be centres of counter-revolutionary preaching. In December 1993, former Libyan foreign minister Mansour Rashid El-Kikhia, a leader of an anti-Gaddafi coalition in exile, was abducted in Cairo. His body was not found until 2012 in a morgue that belonged to Gaddafi's intelligence chief Abdullah Senussi.

In October 1993, elements of the increasingly marginalized army, led by officers from the powerful Warfalla tribe, initiated a failed coup in Misrata and Bani Walid allegedly with help from the National Front for the Salvation of Libya, Khalifa Haftar, and the CIA, while in September 1995, Islamists launched an insurgency in Benghazi, and in July 1996 an anti-Gaddafist football riot broke out in Tripoli. In March 1996, Haftar again briefly returned to Libya to instigate an uprising against Gaddafi in the mountains of eastern Libya. The Revolutionary Committees experienced a resurgence to combat these Islamists.

In 1989, Gaddafi was overjoyed by the foundation of the Arab Maghreb Union, uniting Libya in an economic pact with Mauritania, Morocco, Tunisia, and Algeria, viewing it as beginnings of a new pan-Arab union. Gaddafi was able to recover some influence in Chad after Hissène Habré was overthrown by Idriss Déby in a Libya-sponsored coup in 1990. Déby also gave Gaddafi detailed information about CIA operations in Chad. Meanwhile, Libya stepped up its support for anti-Western militants such as the Provisional IRA, and in 1988, Pan Am Flight 103 was blown up over Lockerbie in Scotland, killing 243 passengers and 16 crew members, plus 11 people on the ground. British police investigations identified two Libyans – Abdelbaset al-Megrahi and Lamin Khalifah Fhimah – as the chief suspects, and in November 1991 issued a declaration demanding that Libya hand them over. When Gaddafi refused, citing the Montreal Convention, the United Nations (UN) imposed Resolution 748 in March 1992, initiating economic sanctions against Libya which had deep repercussions for the country's economy. The country suffered an estimated US$900 million financial loss as a result. Further problems arose with the West when in January 1989, two Libyan warplanes were shot down by the US off the Libyan coast and in September 1989, UTA Flight 772 was blown up over the Ténéré desert in Niger, killing all 170 people on board (156 passengers and 14 crew members).

In 1996, Gaddafi wrote a letter to the newly elected Prime Minister of Bangladesh, Sheikh Mujibur Rahman's daughter Sheikh Hasina, pleading with her to spare the lives of her father's assassins Syed Faruque Rahman and Khandaker Abdur Rashid. Rahman and Rashid both had business ties to Libya.

Many Arab and African states opposed the UN sanctions, with Mandela criticizing them on a visit to Gaddafi in October 1997, when he praised Libya for its work in fighting apartheid and awarded Gaddafi the Order of Good Hope. They would only be suspended in 1998 when Libya agreed to allow the extradition of the suspects to the Scottish Court in the Netherlands, in a process overseen by Mandela. As a result of the trial, Fhimah was acquitted and al-Megrahi convicted. Privately, Gaddafi maintained that he knew nothing about who perpetrated the bombing and that Libya had nothing to do with it.

Pan-Africanism, reconciliation and privatization: 1999–2011

Links with Africa and conflicts in the Arab League

During the final years of the 20th century, Gaddafi—frustrated by the failure of his pan-Arab ideals and the refusal of the Arab world to challenge the international air embargo imposed on Libya—increasingly rejected Arab nationalism in favour of pan-Africanism, emphasizing Libya's African identity. In a 1998 interview, Gaddafi claimed that "the Arab world is finished" and expressed his wish for Libya to become a "black country." From 1997 to 2000, Libya initiated cooperative agreements or bilateral aid arrangements with 10 African states, and in 1999 joined the Community of Sahel-Saharan States. In June 1999, Gaddafi visited Mandela in South Africa, and the following month attended the OAU summit in Algiers, calling for greater political and economic integration across the continent and advocating the foundation of a United States of Africa. He became one of the founders of the African Union (AU), initiated in July 2002 to replace the OAU. At the opening ceremonies, he called for African states to reject conditional aid from the developed world, a direct contrast to the message of South African President Thabo Mbeki. There was speculation that Gaddafi wanted to become the AU's first chair, raising concerns within Africa that this would damage the Union's international standing, particularly with the West.

At the third AU summit, held in Tripoli, Libya, in July 2005, Gaddafi called for greater integration, advocating a single AU passport, a common defence system, and a single currency, using the slogan: "The United States of Africa is the hope." His proposal for a Union of African States, a project originally conceived by Ghana's Kwame Nkrumah in the 1960s, was rejected at the 2001 Assembly of Heads of States and Government (AHSG) summit in Lusaka by African leaders who thought it "unrealistic" and "utopian". In June 2005, Libya joined the Common Market for Eastern and Southern Africa (COMESA). In March 2008 in Uganda, Gaddafi gave a speech once again urging Africa to reject foreign aid. In August 2008, Gaddafi was proclaimed "King of Kings" by a committee of traditional African leaders; they crowned him in February 2009, in a ceremony held in Addis Ababa, Ethiopia. That same month, Gaddafi was elected as the chairperson of the African Union, a position he retained for one year. In October 2010, Gaddafi apologized to African leaders for the historical enslavement of Africans by the Arab slave trade.

Meanwhile, Gaddafi continued to have testy relationships with most of his fellow Arab leaders. In the 2003 Arab League summit, Gaddafi was involved in a public verbal altercation with Abdullah of Saudi Arabia, then the Crown Prince. Gaddafi accused Saudi Arabia of having made an "alliance with the devil" when it invited the US to intervene in the 1991 Gulf War. Abdullah responded that Gaddafi was a "liar" and an "agent of colonizers" and threatened Gaddafi that "your grave awaits you." Two weeks after the summit, Gaddafi allegedly plotted with the Emir Hamad bin Khalifa Al Thani of Qatar to assassinate Abdullah. The plot was overseen by Libyan intelligence chief Moussa Koussa, Mohammed Ismail (a colonel in Gaddafi's military intelligence), and Abdul Rahman al-Amoudi (an American citizen and founder of American Muslim Council). The assassination conspiracy was foiled by Saudi intelligence with the help of the FBI and CIA. Amoudi was sentenced to 23 years in prison in the US and stripped of his American citizenship. Ismail was arrested by Saudi Arabia, pardoned by Abdullah in 2005, and later acquired UAE citizenship due to his close ties with its ruler Mohamed bin Zayed Al Nahyan. After the failure of the assassination plot, Gaddafi continued to discuss instigating a regime change in Saudi Arabia with multiple power brokers in the Persian Gulf, including Qatar's Foreign Minister Hamad bin Jassim bin Jaber Al Thani, Oman's foreign minister Yusuf bin Alawi bin Abdullah, and Kuwaiti extremist preacher Hakem al-Mutairi.

The Gaddafi–Abdullah feud came into public view again in the 2009 Arab League summit when Gaddafi accused Abdullah, who had become King of Saudi Arabia in 2005, of being created by Britain and protected by the US. Alluding to their 2003 altercation, Gaddafi taunted Abdullah for ostensibly avoiding a confrontation with him for six years and quoted Abdullah's 2003 "grave awaits you" threat back at him before storming out of the meeting to visit a museum. Abdullah also left the meeting hall in anger. A Saudi official later claimed that Gaddafi and Abdullah had held a 30 minutes meeting at the sideline of the summit and that the "personal problem" between them was "over."

Rebuilding links with the West

In 1999, Libya began secret talks with the British government to normalize relations. In September 2001, Gaddafi publicly condemned the September 11 attacks on the US by al-Qaeda, expressing sympathy with the victims and calling for Libyan involvement in the US-led War on Terror against militant Islamism. His government continued suppressing domestic Islamism, at the same time as Gaddafi called for the wider application of sharia law. Libya also cemented connections with China and North Korea, being visited by Chinese President Jiang Zemin in April 2002. However, relations with China became strained in May 2006 due to a visit to Tripoli by Taiwanese President Chen Shui-bian. Influenced by the events of the Iraq War, in December 2003, Libya renounced its possession of weapons of mass destruction, decommissioning its chemical and nuclear weapons programs. Relations with the US improved as a result. British Prime Minister Tony Blair visited Gaddafi in March 2004; the pair developed close personal ties. In 2003, Libya paid US$2.7 billion to the families of the victims of Lockerbie bombing as it was the condition the US and UK had made for terminating the remaining UN sanctions. Libya continued to deny any role in the bombing. In 2009, Gaddafi attempted to strong-arm global energy companies operating in Libya to cover Libya's settlement with the families of the victims of Lockerbie.

In 2004, Gaddafi traveled to the headquarters of the European Union (EU) in Brussels—signifying improved relations between Libya and the EU—and the EU dropped its sanctions on Libya. As a strategic player in Europe's attempts to stem illegal migration from Africa, in October 2010, the EU paid Libya over €50 million to stop African migrants passing into Europe; Gaddafi encouraged the move, saying that it was necessary to prevent the loss of European cultural identity to a new "Black Europe". Gaddafi also completed agreements with the Italian government that they would invest in various infrastructure projects as reparations for past Italian colonial policies in Libya. Italian Prime Minister Silvio Berlusconi gave Libya an official apology in 2006, after which Gaddafi called him the "iron man" for his courage in doing so. In August 2008, Gaddafi and Berlusconi signed a historic cooperation treaty in Benghazi; under its terms, Italy would pay $5 billion to Libya as compensation for its former military occupation. In exchange, Libya would take measures to combat illegal immigration coming from its shores and boost investment in Italian companies.

Removed from the US list of state sponsors of terrorism in 2006, Gaddafi nevertheless continued his anti-Western rhetoric. At the 2008 Arab League summit, held in Syria, he warned fellow Arab leaders that they could be overthrown and executed by the US like Saddam Hussein. At the Second Africa-South America Summit, held in Venezuela in September 2009, he called for a military alliance across Africa and Latin America to rival NATO. That month he also addressed the United Nations General Assembly in New York City for the first time, using it to condemn "Western aggression," and spoke for 90 minutes instead of the allotted 15. In Spring 2010, Gaddafi proclaimed jihad against Switzerland after Swiss police accused two of his family members of criminal activity in the country, resulting in the breakdown of bilateral relations.

Gaddafi allegedly financed Nicolas Sarkozy in the 2007 French presidential election. He also financed Austrian far-right politician Jörg Haider starting in 2000.

Economic reform
Libya's economy witnessed increasing privatization; although rejecting the socialist policies of nationalized industry advocated in The Green Book, government figures asserted that they were forging "people's socialism" rather than capitalism. Gaddafi welcomed these reforms, calling for wide-scale privatization in a March 2003 speech; he promised that Libya would join the World Trade Organization. These reforms encouraged private investment in Libya's economy. By 2004, there was US$40 billion of direct foreign investment in Libya, a six-fold rise over 2003. Sectors of Libya's population reacted against these reforms with public demonstrations, and in March 2006, revolutionary hard-liners took control of the GPC cabinet; although scaling back the pace of the changes, they did not halt them. In 2010, plans were announced that would have seen half the Libyan economy privatized over the following decade, these plans appear to have been soon abandoned however, as the companies that the government stated they were going to float on the stock market, among them the National Commercial Bank and the Libyan Iron and Steel Company were never floated and remained 100% state-owned. Many socialist policies remained however, with subsidiaries of logistics company HB Group being nationalized in 2007. Agriculture remained largely untouched by the reforms, with farms remaining cooperatives, the Agricultural Bank of Libya remaining wholly state-owned and state interventionist policies and price controls remaining. The oil industry remained largely state-owned, with the wholly state-owned National Oil Corporation retaining a 70% share in Libya's oil industry, the government also imposed a 93% tax on all oil that foreign companies produced in Libya. Price controls and subsidies over oil and food remained in place, and state-provided benefits such as free education, universal healthcare, free housing, free water and free electricity remained in place. Libya also changed its stance on the WTO after the removal of technocrat Shukri Ghanem, with Gaddafi condemning the WTO as a neocolonial terrorist organisation, and urging African and Third World countries not to join it.

While there was no accompanying political liberalization, with Gaddafi retaining predominant control, in March 2010, the government devolved further powers to the municipal councils. Rising numbers of reformist technocrats attained positions in the country's governance; best known was Gaddafi's son and heir apparent Saif al-Islam Gaddafi, who was openly critical of Libya's human rights record. He led a group who proposed the drafting of a new constitution, although it was never adopted. Involved in encouraging tourism, Saif founded several privately run media channels in 2008, but after criticizing the government, they were nationalized in 2009.

According to leaked 2009 State Department cables, despite economic reform, the Gaddafi regime remained a kleptocracy with a culture rife with "corruption, kickback, strong-arm tactics and political patronage" and had also been accused of engaging in resource nationalism. Gaddafi was a micromanager who insisted on personally signing off on all contracts worth more than $200 million. He was also accused of using Libyan banks to help Iran launder money in violation of international sanctions on Iran. According to Mohamed Layas, the head of the Libyan Investment Authority, disgraced financial fraudsters Bernie Madoff and Allen Stanford had approached Gaddafi in the 2000s about potential investments; Gaddafi rejected their overtures.

Libyan Civil War

Origins and development: February–August 2011

Following the start of the Arab Spring in 2011, Gaddafi spoke out in favour of Tunisian President Zine El Abidine Ben Ali, then threatened by the Tunisian Revolution. He suggested that Tunisia's people would be satisfied if Ben Ali introduced a Jamahiriyah system there. Fearing domestic protest, Libya's government implemented preventive measures by reducing food prices, purging the army leadership of potential defectors, and releasing several Islamist prisoners. This proved ineffective, and on 17 February 2011, major protests broke out against Gaddafi's government. Unlike Tunisia or Egypt, Libya was largely religiously homogeneous and had no strong Islamist movement, but there was widespread dissatisfaction with the corruption and entrenched systems of patronage, while unemployment had reached around 30 percent.

Accusing the rebels of being "drugged" and linked to al-Qaeda, Gaddafi proclaimed that he would die a martyr rather than leave Libya. As he announced that the rebels would be "hunted down street by street, house by house and wardrobe by wardrobe", the army opened fire on protesters in Benghazi, killing hundreds. Shocked at the government's response, a number of senior politicians resigned or defected to the protesters' side. The uprising spread quickly through Libya's less economically developed eastern half. By February's end, eastern cities such as Benghazi, Misrata, al-Bayda, and Tobruk were controlled by rebels, and the Benghazi-based National Transitional Council (NTC) formed to represent them.

In the conflict's early months it appeared that Gaddafi's government—with its greater fire-power—would be victorious. Both sides disregarded the laws of war, committing human rights abuses, including arbitrary arrests, torture, extrajudicial executions, and revenge attacks. On 26 February, the United Nations Security Council passed Resolution 1970, suspending Libya from the UN Human Rights Council, implementing sanctions and calling for an International Criminal Court (ICC) investigation into the killing of unarmed civilians. In March, the Security Council declared a no-fly zone to protect the civilian population from aerial bombardment, calling on foreign nations to enforce it; it also specifically prohibited foreign occupation. Ignoring this, Qatar sent hundreds of troops to support the dissidents and, along with France and the United Arab Emirates, provided weaponry and military training to the NTC. NATO announced that it would enforce the no-fly zone. On 30 April a NATO airstrike killed Gaddafi's sixth son and three of his grandsons in Tripoli. This Western military intervention was criticized by various leftist governments, including those that had criticized Gaddafi's response to the protests, because they regarded it as an imperialist attempt to secure control of Libya's resources.

In June, the ICC issued arrest warrants for Gaddafi, his son Saif al-Islam, and his brother-in-law Abdullah Senussi, head of state security, for charges concerning crimes against humanity. That month, Amnesty International published their report, finding that Gaddafi's forces were responsible for numerous war crimes but added that a number of allegations of human rights abuses lacked credible evidence. The report added that "much Western media coverage has from the outset presented a very one-sided view of the logic of events, portraying the protest movement as entirely peaceful and repeatedly suggesting that the regime's security forces were unaccountably massacring unarmed demonstrators". In July, over 30 governments recognized the NTC as the legitimate government of Libya; Gaddafi called on his supporters to "Trample on those recognitions, trample on them under your feet ... They are worthless". In August, the Arab League recognized the NTC as "the legitimate representative of the Libyan state".

Aided by NATO air cover, the rebel militia pushed westward, defeating loyalist armies and securing control of the centre of the country. Gaining the support of Amazigh (Berber) communities of the Nafusa Mountains, who had long been persecuted as non-Arabic speakers under Gaddafi, the NTC armies surrounded Gaddafi loyalists in several key areas of western Libya. In August, the rebels seized Zliten and Tripoli, ending the last vestiges of Gaddafist power. It is probable that without the NATO air strikes supporting the rebels, they would not have been able to advance west and Gaddafi's forces would have ultimately retaken control of eastern Libya.

Capture and assassination

After the fall of Tripoli, only a few towns in western Libya such as Bani Walid, Sebha, and Sirte remained Gaddafist strongholds. Gaddafi was reportedly planning to catch up with his Sebha commander Ali Kanna's Tuareg forces and seek asylum in Burkina Faso. Instead, Gaddafi retreated to his hometown of Sirte, where he convened a meeting with his son Mutassim and intelligence chief Abdullah Senussi and learned that his youngest son Khamis had been killed by a NATO airstrike on 29 August. In the weeks that followed, Gaddafi continued to broadcast defiant audio messages through Syria-based Arrai TV. On 10 September, General Massoud Abdel Hafiz announced the formation of the Republic of Fezzan in Sebha, where Gaddafi would be president for life. Sebha fell on 22 September.

Surrounding himself with bodyguards and a small entourage, including Mutassim, security chief Mansour Dhao, and defense minister Abu-Bakr Yunis Jabr, Gaddafi continually moved residences to escape NATO and NTC shelling, devoting his days to prayer and reading the Qur'an. On 20 October, Gaddafi recorded a farewell audio message for his family, later publicized by AlHadath, and then broke out of Sirte's District 2 in a joint civilian-military convoy. According to Dhao, it was a "suicide mission" as Gaddafi wanted to die in the Jarref Valley, close to where he was born. At around 08:30, NATO bombers attacked, destroying at least 14 vehicles and killing at least 53 people. The convoy scattered, and Gaddafi and those closest to him fled to a nearby villa, which was shelled by rebel militia from Misrata. Fleeing to a construction site, Gaddafi and his inner cohort hid inside drainage pipes while his bodyguards battled the rebels; in the conflict, Gaddafi suffered head injuries from a grenade blast while Jabr was killed.
The Misrata militia took Gaddafi prisoner, causing serious injuries as they tried to apprehend him; the events were filmed on a mobile phone. A video appears to picture Gaddafi being poked or stabbed in the anus "with some kind of stick or knife" or possibly a bayonet. Pulled onto the front of a pick-up truck, he fell off as it drove away. His semi-naked, lifeless body was then placed into an ambulance and taken to Misrata; upon arrival, he was found to be dead. Official NTC accounts claimed that Gaddafi was caught in a cross-fire and died from bullet wounds. Other eye-witness accounts claimed that rebels had fatally shot Gaddafi in the stomach.

That afternoon, NTC Prime Minister Mahmoud Jibril publicly revealed the news of Gaddafi's death. His corpse was placed in the freezer of a local market alongside the corpses of Yunis Jabr and Mutassim; the bodies were publicly displayed for four days, with Libyans from all over the country coming to view them. Footage of Gaddafi's death was broadcast extensively across media networks internationally. In response to international calls, on 24 October Jibril announced that a commission would investigate Gaddafi's death. On 25 October, the NTC announced that Gaddafi had been buried at an unidentified location in the desert.

Political ideology

Gaddafi's ideological worldview was molded by his environment, namely his Islamic faith, his Bedouin upbringing, and his disgust at the actions of Italian colonialists in Libya. As a schoolboy, Gaddafi adopted the ideologies of Arab nationalism and Arab socialism, influenced in particular by Nasserism, the thought of the Egyptian President Nasser, whom Gaddafi regarded as his hero; Nasser privately described Gaddafi as "a nice boy, but terribly naïve". During the early 1970s, Gaddafi formulated his own particular approach to Arab nationalism and socialism, known as Third International Theory, which The New York Times described as a combination of "utopian socialism, Arab nationalism, and the Third World revolutionary theory that was in vogue at the time". He regarded this system as a practical alternative to the then-dominant international models of Western capitalism and Marxism–Leninism. He laid out the principles of this Theory in the three volumes of The Green Book, in which he sought to "explain the structure of the ideal society".

The Libyan studies specialist Ronald Bruce St. John regarded Arab nationalism as Gaddafi's "primordial value", stating that during the early years of his government, Gaddafi was "the Arab nationalist par excellence". Gaddafi called for the Arab world to regain its dignity and assert a major place on the world stage, blaming Arab backwardness on stagnation resulting from Ottoman rule, European colonialism and imperialism, and corrupt and repressive monarchies. Gaddafi's Arab nationalist views led him to the pan-Arabist belief in the need for unity across the Arab world, combining the Arab nation under a single nation-state. To this end, he had proposed a political union with five neighbouring Arab states by 1974, although without success. In keeping with his views regarding Arabs, his political stance was described as nativist. Gaddafi also had international ambitions, wanting to export his revolutionary ideas throughout the world. Gaddafi saw his socialist Jamahiriyah as a model for the Arab, Islamic, and non-aligned worlds to follow, and in his speeches declared that his Third International Theory would eventually guide the entire planet. He nevertheless had minimal success in exporting the ideology outside of Libya.

Along with Arab nationalism, anti-imperialism was also a defining feature of Gaddafi's regime during its early years. He believed in opposing Western imperialism and colonialism in the Arab world, including any Western expansionism through the form of Israel. He offered support to a broad range of political groups abroad that called themselves "anti-imperialist", especially those that set themselves in opposition to the United States. For many years, anti-Zionism was a fundamental component of Gaddafi's ideology. He believed that the state of Israel should not exist and that any Arab compromise with the Israeli government was a betrayal of the Arab people. In large part due to their support of Israel, Gaddafi despised the United States, considering the country to be imperialist and lambasting it as "the embodiment of evil". He sought to distinguish "oriental" Jews who had lived in the Middle East for generations from the European Jews who had migrated to Palestine during the 20th century, calling the latter "vagabonds" and "mercenaries" who should return to Europe. He rallied against Jews in many of his speeches, with Blundy and Lycett claiming that his anti-Semitism was "almost Hitlerian". As Pan-Africanism increasingly became his focus in the early 21st century, Gaddafi became less interested in the Israel-Palestine issue, calling for the two communities to form a new single-state that he termed "Isratin". This would have led the Jewish population to become a minority within the new state.

Islamic modernism and Islamic socialism

Gaddafi rejected the secularist approach to Arab nationalism that had been pervasive in Syria, with his revolutionary movement placing a far stronger emphasis on Islam than previous Arab nationalist movements had done. He deemed Arabism and Islam to be inseparable, referring to them as "one and indivisible", and called on the Arab world's Christian minority to convert to Islam. He insisted that Islamic law should be the basis for the law of the state, blurring any distinction between the religious and secular realms. He desired unity across the Islamic world, and encouraged the propagation of the faith elsewhere; on a 2010 visit to Italy, he paid a modelling agency to find 200 young Italian women for a lecture he gave urging them to convert. According to the Gaddafi biographer Jonathan Bearman, in Islamic terms Gaddafi was a modernist rather than a fundamentalist, for he subordinated religion to the political system rather than seeking to Islamicise the state as Islamists sought to do. He was driven by a sense of "divine mission", believing himself a conduit of God's will, and thought that he must achieve his goals "no matter what the cost". His interpretation of Islam was nevertheless idiosyncratic, and he clashed with conservative Libyan clerics. Many criticized his attempts to encourage women to enter traditionally male-only sectors of society, such as the armed forces. Gaddafi was keen to improve women's status, although saw the sexes as "separate but equal" and therefore felt women should usually remain in traditional roles.

Gaddafi described his approach to economics as "Islamic socialism". For him, a socialist society could be defined as one in which men controlled their own needs, either through personal ownership or through a collective. Although the early policies pursued by his government were state capitalist in orientation, by 1978 he believed that private ownership of the means of production was exploitative and thus he sought to move Libya away from capitalism and towards socialism. Private enterprise was largely eliminated in favour of a centrally controlled economy. The extent to which Libya became socialist under Gaddafi is disputed. Bearman suggested that while Libya did undergo "a profound social revolution", he did not think that "a socialist society" was established in Libya. Conversely, St. John expressed the view that "if socialism is defined as a redistribution of wealth and resources, a socialist revolution clearly occurred in Libya" under Gaddafi's regime.

Gaddafi was staunchly anti-Marxist, and in 1973 declared that "it is the duty of every Muslim to combat" Marxism because it promotes atheism. In his view, ideologies like Marxism and Zionism were alien to the Islamic world and were a threat to the ummah, or global Islamic community. Nevertheless, Blundy and Lycett noted that Gaddafi's socialism had a "curiously Marxist undertone", with political scientist Sami Hajjar arguing that Gaddafi's model of socialism offered a simplification of Karl Marx and Friedrich Engels's theories. While acknowledging the Marxist influence on Gaddafi's thought, Bearman stated that the Libyan leader rejected Marxism's core tenet, that of class struggle as the main engine of social development. Instead of embracing the Marxist idea that a socialist society emerged from class struggle between the proletariat and bourgeoisie, Gaddafi believed that socialism would be achieved through overturning "unnatural" capitalism and returning society to its "natural equilibrium". In this, he sought to replace a capitalist economy with one based on his own romanticized ideas of a traditional, pre-capitalist past. This owed much to the Islamic belief in God's natural law providing order to the universe.

Personal life

A very private individual, Gaddafi was given to rumination and solitude and could be reclusive. Gaddafi described himself as a "simple revolutionary" and "pious Muslim" called upon by God to continue Nasser's work. Gaddafi was an austere and devout Muslim, although according to Vandewalle, his interpretation of Islam was "deeply personal and idiosyncratic." He was also a football enthusiast and enjoyed both playing the sport and horse riding as a means of recreation. He regarded himself as an intellectual; he was a fan of Beethoven and said his favourite novels were Uncle Tom's Cabin, Roots, and The Stranger.

Gaddafi regarded personal appearance as important, with Blundy and Lycett referring to him as "extraordinarily vain." Gaddafi had a large wardrobe, and sometimes changed his outfit multiple times a day. He favoured either a military uniform or traditional Libyan dress, tending to eschew Western-style suits. He saw himself as a fashion icon, stating "Whatever I wear becomes a fad. I wear a certain shirt and suddenly everyone is wearing it." Two Brazilian plastic surgeons, Liacyr Ribeiro and Fabio Naccache, claimed they were hired by Gaddafi in 1994 to perform a hair transplant and inject belly fat into Gaddafi's face to help him look younger. Following his ascension to power, Gaddafi moved into the Bab al-Azizia barracks, a 6-square-kilometre (2.3 sq mi) fortified compound located two miles from the centre of Tripoli. In the 1980s, his lifestyle was considered modest in comparison to those of many other Arab leaders.

He was preoccupied with his own security, regularly changing where he slept and sometimes grounding all other planes in Libya when he was flying. He made particular requests when travelling to foreign countries. During his trips to Rome, Paris, Madrid, Moscow, and New York City, he resided in a bulletproof tent, following his Bedouin traditions. Gaddafi was notably confrontational in his approach to foreign powers and generally shunned Western ambassadors and diplomats, believing them to be spies.

In the 1970s and 1980s, there were reports of his making sexual advances toward female reporters and members of his entourage. Starting in the 1980s, he travelled with his all-female Amazonian Guard, who were allegedly sworn to a life of celibacy. After Gaddafi's death, the Libyan psychologist Seham Sergewa, part of a team investigating sexual offences during the civil war, stated that five of the guards told her they had been raped by Gaddafi and senior officials. After Gaddafi's death, the French journalist Annick Cojean published a book alleging that Gaddafi had had sexual relations with women, some in their early teenage years, who had been specially selected for him. One of those Cojean interviewed, a woman named Soraya, claimed that Gaddafi kept her imprisoned in a basement for six years, where he repeatedly raped her, urinated on her, and forced her to watch pornography, drink alcohol, and snort cocaine. The alleged sexual abuse was said to have been facilitated by Gaddafi's Chief of Protocol Nuri al-Mismari and Mabrouka Sherif. Gaddafi also hired several Ukrainian nurses to care for him; one described him as kind and considerate and was surprised that allegations of abuse had been made against him.

Gaddafi married his first wife, Fatiha al-Nuri, in 1969. Although they had one son, Muhammad Gaddafi (born 1970), their relationship was strained, and they divorced in 1970. Gaddafi's second wife was Safia Farkash, née el-Brasai, a former nurse from the Obeidat tribe born in Bayda. They met in 1969, following his ascension to power, when he was hospitalized with appendicitis; he claimed that it was love at first sight. The couple remained married until his death. Together they had seven biological children: Saif al-Islam Gaddafi (born 1972), Al-Saadi Gaddafi (born 1973), Mutassim Gaddafi (1974–2011), Hannibal Muammar Gaddafi (born 1975), Ayesha Gaddafi (born 1976), Saif al-Arab Gaddafi (1982–2011), and Khamis Gaddafi (1983–2011). He also adopted two children, Hana Gaddafi and Milad Gaddafi. Several of his sons gained a reputation for lavish and anti-social behaviour in Libya, which proved a source of resentment toward his administration. His cousin Ahmed Gaddaf al-Dam is Libya's former Special Envoy to Egypt and a leading figure of the Gaddafi regime. His other cousin Mansour Dhao was his chief of security.

Public life

According to Vandewalle, Gaddafi "dominated [Libya's] political life" during his period in power. The sociologist Raymond A. Hinnebusch described the Libyan as "perhaps the most exemplary contemporary case of the politics of charismatic leadership", displaying all of the traits of charismatic authority outlined by the sociologist Max Weber. According to Hinnebusch, the foundations of Gaddafi's "personal charismatic authority" in Libya stemmed from the blessing he had received from Nasser coupled with "nationalist achievements" such as the expulsion of foreign military bases, the extraction of higher prices for Libyan oil, and his vocal support for the Palestinian and other anti-imperialist causes.

A cult of personality devoted to Gaddafi existed in Libya through most of his rule. His biographer Alison Pargeter noted that "he filled every space, moulding the entire country around himself." Depictions of his face could be found throughout the country, including on postage stamps, watches, and school satchels. Quotations from The Green Book appeared on a wide variety of places, from street walls to airports and pens, and were put to pop music for public release. In private, Gaddafi often complained that he disliked this personality cult surrounding him, but that he tolerated it because the people of Libya adored him. The cult served a political purpose, with Gaddafi helping to provide a central identity for the Libyan state.

Several biographers and observers characterized Gaddafi as a populist. He enjoyed attending lengthy public sessions where people were invited to question him; these were often televised. Throughout Libya, crowds of supporters would arrive at public events where he appeared. Described as "spontaneous demonstrations" by the government, there are recorded instances of groups being coerced or paid to attend. He was typically late to public events, and would sometimes fail to arrive. Although Bianco thought he had a "gift for oratory", he was considered a poor orator by Blundy and Lycett. The biographer Daniel Kawczynski noted that Gaddafi was famed for his "lengthy, wandering" speeches, which typically involved criticizing Israel and the US. The journalist Ruth First described his speeches as being "an inexhaustible flow; didactic, at times incoherent; peppered with snatches of half-formed opinions; admonitions; confidences; some sound common sense, and as much prejudice".

Awards and honours

Reception and legacy

Gaddafi was a controversial and highly divisive world figure.

 Support 
Supporters praised Gaddafi's administration for the creation of an almost classless society through domestic reform. They stressed the regime's achievements in combating homelessness, ensuring access to food and safe drinking water, and to dramatic improvements in education. Supporters have also applauded achievements in medical care, praising the universal free healthcare provided under the Gaddafist administration, with diseases like cholera and typhoid being contained and life expectancy raised.

Gaddafi claimed that his Jamahiriya was a "concrete utopia", and that he had been appointed by "popular assent", with some Islamic supporters believing that he exhibited barakah. His opposition to Western governments earned him the respect of many in the Euro-American far right, with the UK-based National Front, for instance, embracing aspects of the Third International Theory during the 1980s. His anti-Western stance also attracted praise from the far left; in 1971, the Soviet Union awarded him the Order of Lenin, although his mistrust of atheist Marxism-Leninism prevented him from attending the ceremony in Moscow.

Opposition and criticism

The Libyan anti-Gaddafist movement brought together a diverse array of groups, which had varied motives and objectives. It comprised at least five generations of oppositional forces which included Islamic fundamentalists who opposed his radical reforms, a few active monarchists, members of the old pre-Gaddafist elite, conservative nationalists who backed his Arab nationalist agenda but opposed his left-wing economic reforms, and technocrats who had their future prospects stunted by the 1969 coup. He also faced opposition from rival socialists such as Ba'athists and Marxists; during the Civil War, he was criticized by both left-of-centre and right-of-centre governments for overseeing human rights abuses. Gaddafi became a bogeyman for Western governments, who presented him as the "vicious dictator of an oppressed people". For these critics, Gaddafi was "despotic, cruel, arrogant, vain and stupid," with Pargeter noting that "for many years, he came to be personified in the international media as a kind of super villain."

Gaddafi's government's treatment of non-Arab Libyans came in for criticism from human rights activists, with native Berbers, Italians, Jews, refugees, and foreign workers all facing persecution in Gaddafist Libya. Human rights groups also criticized the treatment of migrants, including asylum seekers, who passed through Gaddafi's Libya on their way to Europe. During the Civil War, various leftist groups endorsed the anti-Gaddafist rebels—but not the Western military intervention—by arguing that Gaddafi had become an ally of Western imperialism by cooperating with the War on Terror and efforts to block African migration to Europe. Gaddafi was widely perceived as a terrorist, especially in the US and UK.

Posthumous assessment

International reactions to Gaddafi's death were divided. Gaddafi was mourned as a hero by many across sub-Saharan Africa but was widely condemned elsewhere.

Following his defeat in the civil war, Gaddafi's system of governance was dismantled and replaced by the interim government of the NTC, which legalized trade unions and freedom of the press. In January 2013, the GNC officially renamed the Jamahiriyah'' as the "State of Libya". Gaddafi loyalists then founded a new political party, the Popular Front for the Liberation of Libya. Led by Saif al-Islam Gaddafi, the Popular Front was allowed to participate in the future general election.

See also
Alleged Libyan financing in the 2007 French presidential election
Disarmament of Libya
Egyptian–Libyan War
History of Libya under Muammar Gaddafi
HIV trial in Libya
Libya and weapons of mass destruction
Pan Am Flight 103
SNC-Lavalin affair
UTA Flight 772
West Berlin discotheque bombing

Notes

References

Citations

Bibliography

Further reading

External links

 U.S. Policy Towards Qaddafi from the Dean Peter Krogh Foreign Affairs Digital Archives
 
 
 
 
 

 
1942 births
2011 deaths
20th-century Libyan people
20th-century politicians
African revolutionaries
Anti-Americanism
Anti-imperialism
Articles containing video clips
Assassinated heads of government
Assassinated heads of state
Assassinated Libyan politicians
Burials in Libya
Date of birth unknown
Deaths by firearm in Libya
Executed heads of state
Muammar
Grand Commanders of the Order of the Federal Republic
Heads of state of Libya
Islamic socialism
Leaders who took power by coup
Libyan Arab nationalists
Libyan Arab Socialist Union politicians
Libyan colonels
Libyan Islamists
Libyan pan-Africanists
Libyan political philosophers
Libyan politicians convicted of crimes
Libyan Quranist Muslims
Libyan revolutionaries
Libyan Sunni Muslims
Members of the General People's Committee of Libya
Muslim socialists
Nasserists
Pan Am Flight 103
People from Sirte
People indicted by the International Criminal Court
People indicted for crimes against humanity
People killed in the First Libyan Civil War
People murdered in Libya
People of the Chadian–Libyan War
Political philosophers
Political writers
Politicide perpetrators
Prime Ministers of Libya
Rape in Libya
Recipients of the Order of Bohdan Khmelnytsky, 1st class
Recipients of the Order of Prince Yaroslav the Wise, 1st class
Secretaries-General of the General People's Congress
Self-proclaimed monarchy